Picrocrocin is a monoterpene glycoside precursor of safranal.  It is found in the spice saffron, which comes from the crocus flower.  Picrocrocin has a bitter taste, and is the chemical most responsible for the taste of saffron.

During the drying process, picrocrocin liberates the aglycone (HTCC, C10H16O2) due to the action of the enzyme glucosidase.  The aglycone is then transformed to safranal by dehydration.  Picrocrocin is a degradation product of the carotenoid zeaxanthin.

References 

  

Monoterpenes
Terpenoid glycosides
Glucosides
Saffron
Aldehydes
Cyclohexenes